Gone With the Rainy Season (Chinese 雨季不再来) is a collection of early writings by Taiwanese author Sanmao.

Background
The stories were written in the author's adolescence when she studied abroad. This book shares the same name of a short story about the time she fell in love with a boy.

References

External links
https://archive.today/20120402174916/http://wx.ccut.edu.cn/article.php?/1747
https://web.archive.org/web/20120402174916/http://web2.tcssh.tc.edu.tw/school/guowenke/books/ajian/sanmao.html list of books
https://web.archive.org/web/20120402174936/http://web2.tcssh.tc.edu.tw/school/guowenke/books/ajian/yj06.html story

Taiwanese fiction